Atractus vittatus  is a species of snake in the family Colubridae. The species can be found in Venezuela.

References 

Atractus
Endemic fauna of Venezuela
Reptiles of Venezuela
Reptiles described in 1894
Taxa named by George Albert Boulenger